John Denniston may refer to:
 John Denniston (judge) (1845–1919), judge of the Supreme Court in Christchurch, New Zealand
 John Dewar Denniston (1887–1949), British classical scholar

See also 
 John Dennison (born 1978), New Zealand poet
 John Denison (disambiguation)